Scott Scrafton (born 18 April 1993) is a New Zealand rugby union player who currently plays as a lock for  in the United Rugby Championship competition.

Early career

Scrafton completed 5 years at Kelston boys' High School, later attended Saint Kentigern College, one of Auckland's premier rugby schools and helped them to win the Auckland senior college final in 2011.   Additionally after building a reputation for himself in the Auckland club scene, he spent 2 years with the  development team.

Senior career

He continued to be a regular starter through 2016, playing in all 10 of Auckland's games during a disappointing season for them which culminated in a 5th place finish on the Premiership log. He played with  until 2021 season.

Super Rugby

After spending 2 years with their development side, Scrafton was handed a wider training group contract with the Auckland based  franchise ahead of the 2016 Super Rugby season. Bekhuis' subsequent departure for France at the end of the season, opened up a spot on the roster for 2017 and Scrafton was upgraded to the Blues first team squad by coach Tana Umaga. He played with Blues until 2019 and with Hurricanes from 2020 to 2022 season.

International

He was a New Zealand Schools representative in 2011 and was also a member of the New Zealand Under 20 team which finished 4th in the 2013 IRB Junior World Championship in France.

Super Rugby Statistics

{| class="wikitable" style="text-align:center; line-height:90%; font-size:95%; width:70%;"
|-
! Season !! Team !! Games !! Starts !! Sub !! Mins !! Tries !! Cons !! Pens !! Drops !! Points !! Yel !! Red 
|-
| 2016 ||  || 1 || 0 || 1 || 12 || 0 || 0 || 0 || 0 || 0 || 0 || 0
|-
!colspan="2"|Total || 1 || 0 || 1 || 12 || 0 || 0 || 0 || 0 || 0 || 0 || 0
23 games for the Auckland Blues.
27 games for the Wellington Hurricanes

References

1993 births
Living people
New Zealand rugby union players
Rugby union locks
Blues (Super Rugby) players
Auckland rugby union players
People educated at Saint Kentigern College
Hurricanes (rugby union) players
Rugby union players from Auckland
Benetton Rugby players